Armed Response may refer to

 Armed Response (1986 film), an American action film directed by Fred Olen Ray
 Armed Response (2013 film), a film starring Ethan Embry
 Armed Response (2017 film), an American action-horror film directed by John Stockwell
 "Armed Response" (Murder, She Wrote), a 1985 television episode

See also
 Armed response vehicle, a type of police car in the UK